Goor is a city about 20 km west of Enschede in the Dutch province of Overijssel. It received city rights in 1263.

Goor was a separate municipality until 2001, when it became a part of Hof van Twente. Goor was the site of a statue of the republican leader Joan Derk van der Capellen tot den Pol, but the statue was destroyed by royalists Orangists after the republican movement was crushed in 1787.

Jewish community
While records of individual Jews in Goor date back to the 14th century, the first permanent records of a Jewish community date to the 1600s when residence permits were issued to Jews. The Jewish population expanded rapidly in the second half of the 18th century. In 1748, Goor had 13 Jewish residents; that number increased to 238 Jews by 1809. 

The  Jewish cemetery of Goor on the Borghoek dates to 1720. 

In 1821, the Jews of Goor joined together with Jews living in the neighboring towns of Diepenheim and Markelo to build the ‘‘Ringsynagoge’’ (regional synagogue). 

The Jewish community thrived throughout the 19th and early 20th centuries. Jews markedly contributed not only to Goor's economic development, but that of the entire Twente region. The Jewish Lavino brothers set up a weaving school in Goor.  The Jew Godfried Salomonson (1838–1911) established the ‘‘Koninklijke Stoomweverij te Nijverdal’’ (the Royal Nijverdal Steam Bleaching Works). Nijverdal means “industrious valley” in Dutch, and was only founded in 1836 with the express purpose of serving as the center of the Dutch Industrial Revolution.
In 1902, a new synagogue replaced the old ‘Ringsynagoge’ with a new synagogue on Schoolstraat. 

As anti-Semitism gripped Nazi Germany in the late 1920s, Goor (like the rest of the Netherlands) saw an influx of Jewish refugees. 

The Nazis occupied the Netherlands in 1940. After the war, nearly the entire Jewish community had been openly murdered or sent to concentration camps where they were killed. 

On March 24, 1945, Allied bombers hit and damaged the Goor Synagogue which had survived the Nazi occupation as a storehouse. 

In 1970, the Dutch government erected a national monument in the Joodse gemeenschap memorializing the Jews whom the Nazis murdered.

Transportation
Railway Station: Goor

Notables
Erik Cent (1962), cyclist
Rutger Kopland (1934–2012), poet
Tommy Wieringa (1964–), writer
Jelle Klaasen (1984–), darts player
  (1979–), poet
Hannie Rouweler (1951–), poet
Peter Veenhuizen (1964–), orchestra conductor and composer
Hinkelien Schreuder (1984– ), swimmer

References

Gallery 

Municipalities of the Netherlands disestablished in 2001
Populated places in Overijssel
Former municipalities of Overijssel
Twente
Hof van Twente